The grey-fronted quail-dove (Geotrygon caniceps) is a species of bird in the family Columbidae. It is endemic to Cuba.

Taxonomy and systematics

The grey-fronted quail-dove and most of what are now the other species in genus Geotrygon were previously in genus Oreopeleia. In addition, it was considered conspecific with what is now the white-fronted quail-dove (Geotrygon leucometopia) under the name "grey-headed quail-dove". Though the taxonomies of the North American Classification Committee of the American Ornithological Society (AOS), the International Ornithological Committee (IOC), and Clements use the English name "grey-fronted quail-dove" for the current G. caniceps, the Handbook of the Birds of the World retains the pre-split "grey-headed quail-dove" name for it.

The grey-fronted quail-dove is monotypic.

Description

They weigh . The adult male's forehead ("front") is grayish white darkening to gray on the rest of the head, with slight purplish iridescence on the back of it. The medium gray throat darkens on the breast, whose sides are gossy purple. The belly is cream and the vent area rufous. The shoulders are glossy purple, the lower back and rump bluish purple, and the tail gray. The adult female is very similar but duller. Juveniles have a brownish gray forehead, pale gray throat, dark brown upperparts, and chestnut underparts.

Distribution and habitat

The grey-fronted quail-dove was formerly found throughout Cuba but is now apparently limited to the island's eastern margin and the Sierra del Rosario in the west.

Behavior

Feeding

The grey-fronted quail-dove forages on the ground, singly or in pairs, where it feeds on seeds and small invertebrates.

Breeding

The grey-fronted quail-dove's breeding season spans at least from Jan to August. The clutch size is one or two.

Vocalization

The grey-fronted quail-dove's song is a "long series of short, low-pitched 'haoo' or 'cooo' notes" that can be given slowly or very fast. It sings year round though less in the wet season.

Status

The IUCN has assessed the grey-fronted quail-dove as Vulnerable because it has a small population that is declining due to hunting and habitat loss.

References

External links
Stamps (for Cuba-(2))
Geotrygon caniceps-"Grey-fronted quail-dove" photo gallery VIREO
 Article oiseaux.net

grey-fronted quail-dove
Endemic birds of Cuba
grey-fronted quail-dove
grey-fronted quail-dove
Taxonomy articles created by Polbot